WAWK (1140 AM) is a radio station  broadcasting a classic hits format. Licensed to Kendallville, Indiana, United States.  The station is currently owned by Northeast Indiana Broadcasting. WAWK programming is simulcast on FM translators W232DK (94.3 MHz) in Auburn and W238BH (95.5 MHz) in Kendallville.

References

External links

 FCC History Cards for WAWK (covering 1954-1981 as WKTL / WAWK)

AWK
AWK
Radio stations established in 1956